Stroke order is the order in which the strokes of a Chinese character (or Chinese derivative character) are written. A stroke is a movement of a writing instrument on a writing surface. Chinese characters are used in various forms in Chinese, Japanese, and Korean. They are known as Hanzi in (Mandarin) Chinese, kanji in Japanese, and Hanja in Korean.

Basic principles
Chinese characters are basically logograms constructed with strokes. Over the millennia a set of generally agreed rules have been developed by custom. Minor variations exist between countries, but the basic principles remain the same, namely that writing characters should be economical, with the fewest hand movements to write the most strokes possible. This promotes writing speed, accuracy, and readability. This idea is particularly important since as learners progress, characters often get more complex. Since stroke order also aids learning and memorization, students are often taught about it from a very early age in schools and encouraged to follow them. 

The Eight Principles of Yong ( Pinyin: yǒngzì bā fǎ; Japanese: eiji happō; Korean: , yeongjapalbeop, yŏngjap'albŏp) uses the single character , meaning "eternity", to teach eight of the most basic strokes in Regular Script.

Stroke order per style

Ancient China
In ancient China, the Jiǎgǔwén characters carved on ox scapula and tortoise plastrons showed no indication of stroke order. The characters show huge variations from piece to piece, sometimes even within one piece. During the divination ceremony, after the cracks were made, the characters were written with a brush on the shell or bone (to be carved in a workshop later). Although the brush-written stroke order is not discernible after carving, there exists some evidence that it was not entirely idiosyncratic: a few of the characters, often marginal administrative notations recording the provenance of the shells or bones, were not later recarved, and the stroke order of these characters tends to resemble traditional and modern stroke order. For those characters (the vast majority) which were later engraved into the hard surface using a knife, perhaps by a separate individual, there is evidence (from incompletely engraved pieces) that in at least some cases all the strokes running one way were carved, then the piece was turned, and strokes running another way were then carved.

Imperial China
In early Imperial China, the common script was the Xiaozhuan style. About 220 BC, the emperor Qin Shi Huang, the first to conquer all of China, imposed Li Si's character uniformisation, a set of 3300 standardized Xiǎozhuàn characters. Its graphs on old steles—some dating from 200 BC—reveal indications of the stroke order of the time. However, stroke order could still not yet be ascertained from the steles, and no paper from that time is extant.

The true starting point of stroke order is the Lìshū style (clerical script) which is more regularized, and in some ways similar to modern text. In theory, by looking at the Lìshū style steles' graphs and the placement of each stroke, one can see hierarchical priority between the strokes, which indicates the stroke order used by the calligrapher or stele sculptors.

Kǎishū style (regular script)—still in use today—is more regularized, allowing one to more easily guess the stroke order used to write on the steles. The stroke order 1000 years ago was similar to that toward the end of Imperial China. The Kangxi and current shapes have tiny differences, while current stroke order is still the same, according to the old style. However, the stroke orders implied by the Kangxi dictionary are not necessarily similar to nowadays' norm.

Cursive styles and hand-written styles
Cursive styles such as Xíngshū (semi-cursive or running script) and Cǎoshū (cursive or grass script) show stroke order more clearly than Regular Script, as each move made by the writing tool is visible.

Stroke order per polity 
The modern governments of mainland China, Hong Kong, Taiwan, and Japan have standardized official stroke orders to be taught in schools. These stroke order standards are prescribed in conjunction to each government's standard character sets. The various official stroke orders agree on the vast majority of characters, but each has its differences. No governmental standard matches traditional stroke orders completely. The differences between the governmental standards and traditional stroke orders arise from accommodation for schoolchildren who may be overwhelmed if the rules about stroke orders are too detailed, or if there are too many exceptions. The differences listed below are not exhaustive.
 Traditional stroke order: Widely used in Imperial China, currently used in the Chinese cultural sphere secondary to each region's governmental standards. Practiced mainly by informed scholars of calligraphy. Also called "calligraphic" stroke order. These stroke orders are established by study of handwritten documents from pre-Republic China, especially those of notable calligraphers. These stroke orders are most conservative regarding etymology, character construction, character evolution, and tradition. Many characters have more than one stroke correct form. Stroke orders may vary depending on the script style. Unlike the other standards, this is not a governmental standard.
 Japanese stroke order: Prescribed mostly in modern Japan. The standard character set of the MEXT is the Jōyō kanji, which contains many characters reformed in 1946. The MEXT lets editors freely prescribe a character's stroke order, which all should "follow commonsensical orders which are widely accepted in the society". This standard diverges from the traditional stroke order in that the two sides of the grass radical are joined, and written with three strokes.
 Taiwan stroke order: Prescribed mostly in modern Taiwan. The standard character set of the ROC Ministry of Education is the Standard Form of National Characters. This standard diverges from the traditional stroke order in that the upper-right dot of the  component is written second to last.
 Mainland China stroke order: Prescribed mostly in modern Mainland China. In 1956, the government of the PRC introduced many newly created characters and substitutions, called Simplified Chinese characters, which form part of the PRC Ministry of Education's standard character set, the Xiàndài Hànyǔ Chángyòng Zìbiǎo. This in turn reformed the stroke order of many characters. Besides these characters, this standard diverges from the traditional stroke order in characters with the  radical, merging both sides like the Japanese standard. In 1997, the PRC Ministry of Education published the official stroke order standard for commonly used characters.
 Hong Kong stroke order: Prescribed mostly in modern Hong Kong. The standard character set of the Hong Kong Education Bureau is the List of Forms of Frequently Used Characters. In this standard,  is written vertical–horizontal–vertical–horizontal, instead of the traditional vertical–horizontal–horizontal–vertical.  starts with the horizontal.

Alternative stroke orders 
Besides general errors and regional differences in stroke order, it is common in the PRC to apply alternative stroke orders which resemble PRC stroke orders to Traditional Chinese characters, although the PRC generally uses Simplified characters. In the below example, the traditional character  is shown with both the traditional stroke order (left, starting with the left vertical stroke), as in imperial China, Taiwan, Japan, and Hong Kong, and with the Simplified stroke order (right, with the left vertical stroke fourth).

General guidelines 

Note: There are exceptions within and among different standards. The following are only guidelines.

1. Write from top to bottom, and left to right. 

As a general rule, strokes are written from top to bottom and left to right. For example, among the first characters usually learned is the number one, which is written with a single horizontal line: . This character has one stroke which is written from left to right.

The character for "two" has two strokes: . In this case, both are written from left to right, but the top stroke is written first. The character for "three" has three strokes: . Each stroke is written from left to right, starting with the uppermost stroke.

This rule also applies to the order of components. For example,  can be divided into two. The entire left side is written before the right side. There are some exceptions to this rule, mainly occurring when the right side of a character has a lower enclosure (see below).

2. Horizontal before vertical 

When horizontal and vertical strokes cross, horizontal strokes are usually written before vertical strokes: the character for "ten", has two strokes. The horizontal stroke, is written first, followed by the vertical stroke, to obtain .

In the Japanese standard, a vertical stroke may precede many intersecting horizontal strokes if the vertical stroke does not pass through the lowest horizontal stroke.

3. Character-spanning strokes last 

4. Diagonals right-to-left before diagonals left-to-right 

5. Center before outside in vertically symmetrical characters 

In vertically symmetrical characters, the center components are written before components on the left or right.

6. Enclosures before contents  

7. Left vertical before enclosing 

Left vertical strokes are written before enclosing strokes.

8. Bottom enclosures last 

9. Dots and minor strokes last 

Representations 
There are various ways to describe the stroke order of a character. Children learn the stroke order in courses, as part of writing learning. Various graphical representations are possible, most notably successive images of the character with one more stroke added (or changing color) each time, numbering strokes, color-coding, fanning, and more recently animations. Stroke order is often described in person by writing characters on paper or in the air.

See also

 Chinese character
 Chinese characters description languages
 CJK strokes
 Horizontal and vertical writing in East Asian scripts
 Radical (Chinese character)

Notes

References
Traditional stroke order
 
 

ROC stroke order
  (Authoritative)

PRC stroke order
  (Authoritative)

Japanese
  (Authoritative from 1958 to 1977).
 Hadamitzky, Wolfgang & Mark Spahn.  A Handbook of the Japanese Writing System.  Charles E. Tuttle Co.  .
 Henshall, Kenneth G. A Guide to Remembering Japanese Characters. Charles E. Tuttle Co.  .
 O'Neill, P.G.  Essential Kanji: 2,000 Basic Japanese Characters Systematically Arranged for Learning and Reference.  Weatherhill.  .
 
 Includes a translation of the Japanese Ministry of Education rules on Kanji stroke order.

Hong Kong
 . Online version available at http://www.edbchinese.hk/lexlist_ch/. (Print version is official curriculum supporting material.)

Archaic characters
 

Other issues

External links

PRC
Animated stroke order, from the California State University, Long Beach
LearnchineseOK.com Web resources, instructions and animations for Chinese character stroke order
Animated stroke order for Chinese characters Stroke Order tool with option to see many characters' stroke order at once.

ROC
Learning Program for Stroke Order of Frequently Used Chinese Characters (常用國字標準字體筆順學習網) with animated stroke order, by the Ministry of Education, R.O.C. (Taiwan).

Hong Kong
中英對照香港學校中文學習基礎字詞 - Lexical Items with English Explanations for Fundamental Chinese Learning in Hong Kong Schools, by the Hong Kong Education Bureau
香港標準字形及筆順 - stroke orders following the Hong Kong Education Bureau's List of Commonly Used Characters

Japanese
Kanji Stroke Order, from the Engineering Department of New Mexico Tech, Socorro.
Kanji alive, a free web application for learning Japanese kanji with stroke order animations.
SODER Project, 1,513 Japanese kanji stroke order diagrams and animations, freely downloadable under license.
Kakijun Kanji stroke order animations.
Kanji stroke order font, Japanese kanji stroke order diagrams presented as a TrueType font.
Kanji Kakijun navi Japanese kanji stroke order.

Korean
한자사전(漢字辭典) with stroke order diagrams 

Chinese characters
East Asian calligraphy
Japanese writing system
Korean writing system
Ordering
Orthography